Esprit de Corps is a Canadian military magazine operating out of Ottawa, Ontario,  by publisher and former soldier Scott Taylor. The magazine reports on Canada and international military issues, politics, military history and current events. Esprit de Corps was originally designed to be an in-flight reading magazine in 1988 for passengers on Canadian Forces aircraft. Each issue features "On Target", an article written by Scott Taylor about current events. The magazine features a letter to the editor section where readers may comment on earlier issues, as well as a "hit and miss" page of short articles on current events. The magazine also features sections on military history such as "The Fight for Canada" and Les Peate's "The Old Guard."

Esprit de Corps boasts such influential subscribers as former Chief of Defence Staff General Rick Hillier, former Minister of National Defence Gordon O'Connor, Chief of the Land Staff Lieutenant-General Andrew Leslie, former Air Command Lieutenant-General Steve Lucas and Canadian Senator Colin Kenny.

History
Esprit de Corps was first created in 1988 by Scott Taylor and his wife Katherine Taylor. The idea for the magazine began during a flight from Canadian Forces Base Lahr (CFB) to Germany, when the couple noted that Canadian Air Force planes lacked any on-board entertainment system or reading material. Scott and Katherine Taylor submitted their proposal — which was eventually accepted — to create an in-flight magazine for the Canadian Forces five passenger aircraft.

In the première issue of Esprit de Corps, Taylor explained the purpose of the publication: "By focusing on the past and present accomplishments of the Canadian Forces, it is our aim to contribute to the 'esprit de corps' that has made the Canadian military one of the finest professional armed forces in the world today." The content began as a bilingual seatback magazine, designed with many illustrations and small articles that provided entertainment and reading for the aircraft passengers.

Due to the collapse of the Soviet Union and the Canadian government's subsequent downsizing of its military expenditures, the Canadian Forces were experiencing budget cuts and changing the way in which their personnel would be transported. This affected Esprit de Corps drastically, as Canadian Forces personnel would now be transported on flights chartered by Air Canada. Because of the loss of its Canadian Air Force distribution and the cost-cutting atmosphere of the military community, the Taylors decided to convert their magazine to a newsstand monthly.

The new magazine would feature mainly current military news and Canadian military history. The magazine continued to retain its seat-back distribution with Air Canada military charters and Scott Taylor began to hire staff to help fill their new eighty-four page format.

In 1991, Esprit de Corps ran a controversial article, in which Scott Taylor stated that, "With the appointment of Marcel Masse as Defence Minister and the subsequent announcement of pending base closures, personnel cutbacks and procurement delays, it would appear that the Canadian military is forever destined to win wars on foreign soil and lose battles on Parliament Hill." The issue also featured an exclusive interview with Vice-Admiral Charles Thomas, who that April had resigned as vice-chief of defence staff over policy differences with the government. The Department of National Defence had taken the unusual step of releasing Thomas' letter of resignation along with a response from Chief of Defence Staff John de Chastelain attacking Thomas' motives rather than addressing his concerns about the direction of the Canadian Forces.

Not long after publication, Air Canada, which now handled the Canadian Forces' charter flights, informed the magazine that "due to concerns over editorial content" it would no longer be welcome on board, on orders from the Department of National Defence. Esprit de Corps went to the media with the story of censorship and threatened to issue a press release detailing corruption involving the DND official magazine Canadian Defence Quarterly. The DND’s decision was reversed and Esprit de Corps was quickly reinstated on the flights.

Disputes with the Department of National Defence

1993 cover up of Daniel Gunther's death

In 1993, Esprit de Corps with the help of Sun Media, reported on Department of National Defence (DND) fabrications regarding the death of Cpl. Daniel Gunther during Operation Medak Pocket in the Croatian War of Independence. DND reported that Gunther had died of injuries received when a mortar shell landed near his APC, characterizing the death as closer to an accident or misadventure than a deliberate murder, despite clear information available in the original report that showed he had been hit in the chest with a rocket-propelled grenade.

The reaction from the DND to this exposé was swift, as the magazine was once again banned from the Canadian Forces flights. This time, the eviction was permanent and Esprit de Corps was abruptly granted its full independence.

February 1994 abuse of Canadian peacekeepers

Scott Taylor aggressively challenged yet another cover-up by the DND in his February 1994 letter from the publisher. The capture and abuse, including mock executions of 11 Canadian peacekeepers at the hands of drunken Serbian soldiers remained unreported by DND until it was discovered by The New York Times.

July 1994 Shidane Arone "Scapegoat" article

The issue featured a three-page interview with Lieutenant-General Gordon Reay, commander of the army. The July 1994 issue marked Esprit de Corps' strongest editorial statement to date. The cover depicted Trooper Kyle Brown, who had been sentenced to five years in the death of Shidane Arone in Somalia. The headline: "Scapegoat".

Inside were pages of analysis of how the media had been manipulated throughout the Somalia incident, the political background of the scandal and reminders that Brown, who had written to Esprit de Corps in an attempt to explain his side of the story, had been under orders to "abuse" prisoners and had himself been the one to inform his superiors about the murder of Arone.

Misuse of funds for public affairs branch

Esprit de Corps uncovered the misuse of $19, 503, 46 for regimental items for the public affairs branch, a personal expense improperly authorized by Major Robert Butt. The story "Exposing Major Butt" would not be the last update on the saga, nor the last of the increasingly off-colour puns with which they would be headlined.

Esprit de Corps Books publishing

Since the mid-1990s, Esprit de Corps investigations of the Canadian military, both its proud history and its current challenges, have laid the foundation for 14 books, with Canadian publishers and the in-house Esprit de Corps Books imprint. Some of these books have been translated into Serbian, Macedonian, and Japanese.

Tested Mettle: Canada's Peacekeepers (1998)

The debut publication from Esprit de Corps Books, Tested Mettle was intended to be the companion piece to Scott Taylor's Tarnished Brass: Crime and Corruption in the Canadian Military but was unable to secure a publisher. Tested Mettle exposed new failures in military leadership, including the bureaucratic confiscation of a wounded soldier’s wheelchair and reservists losing their pay as soon as they were hospitalized with injuries.

INAT: Images of Serbia and the Kosovo Conflict (2000)

INAT is a story of the NATO air raids during the Serbia and Kosovo conflict; Scott Taylor was a spectator there. For 25 days in May and June 1999, Taylor reported on the NATO air campaign from inside Yugoslavia as one of the few western journalists to be granted access. During his time, he was able to get a unique perspective on the conflict: that of the Serbian’s perspective.

Diary of an Uncivil War: The Violent Aftermath of the Kosovo Conflict (2002) 

Diary of an Uncivil War is the story of Kosovo as written by Taylor, consisting primarily of his first-hand observations and interviews with the people and players involved in the aftermath of the Kosovo conflict. It is a personal account of the war and its aftermath in Serbia and Macedonia.

Spinning on the Axis of Evil: America's War against Iraq (2003)

Spinning on the Axis of Evil was based on Taylor's personal experiences and observations from 14 trips into Iraq before and after the toppling of Saddam's regime. This book provides insight into the Iraqi civilians who suffered during the wars in Iraq, as well as the sanctions imposed on the country.

Among the 'Others': the Forgotten Turkmen of Iraq (2004)

In Among the 'Others''' Taylor investigates the often unheard of Turkmen population of Iraq, who have been repressed by several Iraq regimes. Taylor offers his personal observations of the Turkmen who have suffered from political oppression and ethnic violence. The book also details Scott Taylor's kidnapping in northern Iraq by Ansar al-Islam militants.

Unreconciled Differences: Turkey, Armenia and Azerbaijan (2010)

In Unreconciled Differences, Taylor explains the current differences between Armenians and Turks, and Armenians and Azerbaijanis. Having visited these regions several times and spoken at length to their populations, Taylor sheds light on the events of 1915 in the Ottoman Empire and 1988-1994 in Azerbaijan. The book explores the regional conflicts of these countries and how they remained unresolved to this day.

Canada's Secret Commandos (2002)Canada's Secret Commandos is an exposé of the JTF2 secret military unit, written by Ottawa Citizens award winning defence correspondent David Pugliese. It contains dozens of interviews and analysis of previously classified government documents, each piecing together the story of Canada's most secretive military unit. Canada's Secret Commandos is one of the most significant coverings of the unit to date and is even acknowledged as such by the JTF2.

Battles without Borders: The Rise and Fall of New France (2005)

Far from a peaceful kingdom of legend inhabited by an unmilitary people, Canada has been shaped by war. Not only has war made possible Canada's very existence, it has shaped its myths and memories and defined the national identity. Bill Twatio chronicles the history of Canada from the first skirmishes between the Vikings and the Dorset peoples, through the final fall of New France.

Sacrifice and Suffering (2006)Sacrifice and Suffering is a book edited by Kerkuk Turkmenoolu, with a foreword by Scott Taylor, that explains the struggles and problems of the Turkmen peoples of Iraq.

Shadow Wars (2003)Shadow Wars by David Pugliese is an expanded research on special forces units around the world and the critical, often secretive, role they have had in the recent wars involving the United States.

Uneasy Neighbours: Conflicts that Defined Canada (2005)Uneasy Neighbours is a historical analysis by Bill Twatio, in which he chronicles Canada's military history by looking at the country's fragile relationship with the United States of America, from the American Revolution and the War of 1812, to the rebellions in Upper and Lower Canada, the U.S Civil War and the Fenian Raids. Uneasy Neighbours describes the often tumultuous relationship between Canada and the United States.

The War That Wasn't: Canadians in Korea (2005)The War That Wasn't written by Les Peate explains the unpleasant and dangerous Korean War and describes the almost 27,000 Canadians who fought in it. It contains the stories of the Canadians and their allies who served in the Korean theatre between 1950 and 1953.

From Baddeck to the Yalu (2005)

Albert Prince was killed in action five days before his country declared war in 1939. Hammy Gray was shot down in a daring attack six days before the end of the Pacific War in 1945. That afternoon Lt. Gerald Anderson of Trenton died trying to land a crippled aircraft on Gray's carrier. An air gunner in WWII, Norm Shannon's interest in the role of Canadians in aerial warfare has culminated in this personal look at the impressive place they hold in military aviation history.

2005 redesign

In March 2005, Esprit de Corps'' changed its format to coincide with the changes occurring to Canada's military. The magazine was redesigned and revamped with a new logo, more colour, commentary and a higher page count. New regular features were added such as "Hits and Misses", "At Ease" and the humour and trivia section.

External links
 
 Esprit de Corps YouTube Channel
 Daniel Gunther Memorial Website

History magazines published in Canada
Magazines established in 1988
Military magazines published in Canada
Monthly magazines published in Canada
Magazines published in Ottawa
1988 establishments in Ontario